Clodagh Standing Stones is a pair of standing stones forming a stone row and National Monument located in County Cork, Ireland.

Location

History

The stones probably date to the Bronze Age period.

The purpose of standing stones is unclear; they may have served as boundary markers, ritual or ceremonial sites, burial sites or astrological alignments.

Description

The stones are both about 1 m (3.3 ft) tall.

References

National Monuments in County Cork
Megalithic monuments in Ireland